Larry Olsen (born 1948 in Nudgee Beach, Queensland) is an Australian retired jockey and former reporter for Sky Racing Australia who is best known for riding Kensei to victory in the 1987 Melbourne Cup.

In 2007, Olsen was inducted into the Queensland Racing Hall of Fame.

Olsen married Townsville-born Maureen in the early 1970s, and remained together until her death caused by cancer, aged 61, on 1 November 2011 at a Gold Coast hospital, exactly 24 years after Olsen's Melbourne Cup victory. She was survived by her three children with Olsen, and five grandchildren.

References

Australian jockeys
People from Brisbane
Living people
1948 births